is the pen name of Japanese writer . From 2002 to 2015, she wrote her name in hiragana.

Biography
Yoshimoto was born in Tokyo on July 24, 1964, and grew up in a liberal family. Her father is the poet and critic Takaaki Yoshimoto, and her sister, Haruno Yoiko, is a well-known cartoonist in Japan.

Yoshimoto graduated from Nihon University's College of Art with a major in literature. While there, she adopted the pseudonym "Banana", after her love of banana flowers, a name she recognizes as both "cute" and "purposefully androgynous."

Yoshimoto keeps her personal life guarded and reveals little about her certified rolfing practitioner husband, Hiroyoshi Tahata, or son (born in 2003). Each day she takes half an hour to write at her computer, and she says, "I tend to feel guilty because I write these stories almost for fun." Between 2008 and 2010, she maintained an online journal for English-speaking fans.

Writing career
Yoshimoto began her writing career while working as a waitress at a golf club restaurant, in 1987.

Her debut work, Kitchen (1988), had over 60 printings in Japan alone. There have been two film adaptations: a Japanese TV movie and a more widely released version titled Wo ai chu fang, produced in Hong Kong by Ho Yim in 1997.

In November 1987, Yoshimoto won the 6th Kaien Newcomer Writers Prize for Kitchen; in 1988, the novel was nominated for the Mishima Yukio Prize, and in 1989, it received the 39th Minister of Education's Art Encouragement Prize for New Artists. In 1988 (January), she also won the 16th Izumi Kyōka Prize for Literature, for the novella Moonlight Shadow, which is included in most editions of Kitchen.

Another one of her novels, Goodbye Tsugumi (1989), received mixed reviews but was made into a 1990 movie directed by Jun Ichikawa.

Publications
Her works include twelve novels and seven collections of essays (including Pineapple Pudding and Song From Banana) which have together sold over six million copies worldwide. Her themes include love and friendship, the power of home and family, and the effect of loss on the human spirit.

In 1998, she wrote the foreword to the Italian edition of the book Ryuichi Sakamoto. Conversazioni by musicologist Massimo Milano.

In 2013, Yoshimoto wrote the serialized novel, Shall We Love? (僕たち、恋愛しようか?), for the women's magazine Anan, with singer-actor Lee Seung-gi as the central character. The romance novel was the first of her works to feature a Korean singer as the central character.

Writing style
Yoshimoto says that her two main themes are "the exhaustion of young Japanese in contemporary Japan" and "the way in which terrible experiences shape a person's life".

Her works describe the problems faced by youth, urban existentialism, and teenagers trapped between imagination and reality. Her works are targeted not only to the young and rebellious, but also to grown-ups who are still young at heart. Yoshimoto's characters, settings, and titles have a modern and American approach, but the core is Japanese. She addresses readers in a personal and friendly way, with warmth and outright innocence, writing about the simple things such as the squeaking of wooden floors or the pleasant smell of food. Food and dreams are recurring themes in her work which are often associated with memories and emotions. Yoshimoto admits that most of her artistic inspiration derives from her own dreams and that she'd like to always be sleeping and living a life full of dreams.

She named American author Stephen King as one of her first major influences and drew inspiration from his non-horror stories. As her writing progressed, she was further influenced by Truman Capote and Isaac Bashevis Singer. Also manga artist Yumiko Ōshima was an inspiration.

Awards
In 1987, Yoshimoto won the Kaien Newcomer Writers Prize, for Kitchen. In 1988, she was awarded the 16th Izumi Kyōka Prize for Literature, for Moonlight Shadow. The following year, she earned two more accolades: the 39th Minister of Education's Art Encouragement Prize for New Artists (for the fiscal year of 1988), for Kitchen and Utakata/Sanctuary, and the 2nd Yamamoto Shūgorō Prize, for Goodbye Tsugumi. In 1995, she won the 5th Murasaki Shikibu Prize for Amrita, her first full-length novel. And in 2000, she received the 10th Bunkamura Deux Magots Literary Prize, for Furin to Nambei, a collection of stories set in South America.

Outside Japan, she has been awarded prizes in Italy: the Scanno Literary Prize in 1993, the Fendissime Literary Prize in 1996, the Literary Prize Maschera d'Argento in 1999, and the Capri Award in 2011.

The Lake was longlisted for the 2011 Man Asian Literary Prize.

Bibliography
Titles between parentheses are rough translations if the novel has not been translated.

References

External links

 
 Article from ''Metropolis
 Bananamania
 Romantic Love in the Early Fiction of Banana Yoshimoto
 "Banana Yoshimoto's brand-new era" -(J-pop.com overview)

1964 births
Japanese women novelists
Living people
Nihon University alumni
Postmodern writers
20th-century Japanese novelists
20th-century Japanese women writers
21st-century Japanese novelists
21st-century Japanese women writers
21st-century Japanese writers
People from Tokyo
20th-century pseudonymous writers
21st-century pseudonymous writers
Pseudonymous women writers